Walter Scheel (8 July 1919 – 24 August 2016) was a German statesman. A member of the Free Democratic Party of Germany (FDP), he first served in government as the Federal Minister of Economic Cooperation and Development from 1961 to 1966 and later as President of Germany from 1974 to 1979. He led the FDP from 1968 to 1974.

During the chancellorship of Willy Brandt, Scheel was  Federal Minister of Foreign Affairs and the Vice Chancellor. Scheel became acting Chancellor of West Germany from 7–16 May 1974 following Brandt's resignation after the Guillaume Affair. He was elected shortly after as the president of West Germany, remaining in the role until 1979. Scheel was a member of the Evangelical Church in Germany.

Early life
Scheel was born in Solingen (now in North Rhine-Westphalia). He completed his Abitur at the Reformrealgymnsasium Schwertstraße.

Scheel became a member of the Nazi Party in 1942. During World War II, he served in the Luftwaffe during the last years of the war as a radar operator on a Bf 110 night fighter.

Political career

When his Free Democratic Party reentered government in a coalition with Konrad Adenauer's Christian Democratic Union in 1961, Scheel was appointed federal minister of economic cooperation and development. He continued in that office under Chancellor Ludwig Erhard but brought about the downfall of the latter in late 1966 by resigning.

A Christian Democratic/Social Democratic Grand Coalition followed. During this time, in 1968, Scheel took over the party presidency from right wing liberal Erich Mende. According to one study, the election of Walter Scheel to the FDP leadership in 1968 “represented a turn to the left and the Free Democrats then indicated their wooing of the SPD by voting for the successful Social Democratic candidate for the Presidency of the Republic, Gustav Heinemann, in 1969.”

In 1969, he led his party to form a new coalition with the Social Democrats. Under Chancellor Willy Brandt, Scheel became Foreign Minister and Vice Chancellor. Under their leadership, West Germany pursued a course of rapprochement and détente with the Soviet block and officially recognized the existence of the German Democratic Republic (GDR). This policy caused a massive public debate, with various Free and Social Democrats switching sides to the opposition. Though an attempt to oust Brandt failed, the coalition had lost its slender majority. The parliamentary stalemate was ended by the dissolution of parliament and early elections in 1972, which brought great gains for the Social Democrats and enabled the coalition to continue.

On 7 May 1974, Brandt resigned as chancellor after one of his aides, Günter Guillaume, was arrested as a spy for the East German state. Though this had been internally suspected since 1973, Brandt accepted responsibility and resigned. Scheel, as acting chancellor, chaired the government meetings for a little over a week, until Helmut Schmidt was elected. One of his first official acts as acting Chancellor was the award of the war blind radio play prize to Alfred Behrens on 8 May 1974. On 14 May, he chaired the cabinet meeting once. Hans Dietrich Genscher became Scheel's successor as party chairman and as minister.

Scheel was elected President of West Germany, a week after relinquishing his other government roles. He held the office from July 1974 until June 1979. At the funeral of Hanns Martin Schleyer in October 1977, Scheel gave a speech entitled shame. After the federal presidency, Scheel was Chairman of the Bilderberg Conference as well as President of the European Movement in Germany from 1980-85. From 1980-89 he was also President of the German section of the Union of European Federalists (UEF). He was named honorary chairman of the Friedrich Naumann Foundation in 1991.

Death
Scheel died on 24 August 2016 following a long illness. Having lived to  he holds the record as the longest-lived German head of state, either imperial or elected.

Publications
 with Karl-Hermann Flach and Werner Maihofer: Die Freiburger Thesen der Liberalen. Rowohlt, Hamburg 1972, .
 Die Zukunft der Freiheit – Vom Denken und Handeln in unserer Demokratie. Econ, 1979.
 Wen schmerzt noch Deutschlands Teilung? 2 Reden zum 17. Juni, Rowohlt, Reinbek 1986, .
 with Otto Graf Lambsdorff: Freiheit in Verantwortung, Deutscher Liberalismus seit 1945. Bleicher, 1988, .
 with Jürgen Engert: Erinnerungen und Einsichten. Hohenheim-Verlag, Stuttgart 2004, .
 with Tobias Thalhammer: Gemeinsam sind wir stärker – Zwölf erfreuliche Geschichten über Jung und Alt. Allpart Media, Berlin 2010, .

Literature
 Hans-Dietrich Genscher (Hrsg.): Heiterkeit und Härte: Walter Scheel in seinen Reden und im Urteil von Zeitgenossen. Deutsche Verlagsanstalt, Stuttgart 1984, .
 Hans-Roderich Schneider: Präsident des Ausgleichs. Bundespräsident Walter Scheel. Ein liberaler Politiker. Verlag Bonn aktuell, Stuttgart 1975, .

References

External links

The German Federal Presidents

 
1919 births
2016 deaths
20th-century presidents of Germany
20th-century Chancellors of Germany
People from the Rhine Province
German Lutherans
People from Solingen
Presidents of Germany
Foreign Ministers of Germany
Chairmen of the Steering Committee of the Bilderberg Group
Members of the Bundestag for North Rhine-Westphalia
Members of the Bundestag 1972–1976
Members of the Bundestag 1969–1972
Members of the Bundestag 1965–1969
Members of the Bundestag 1961–1965
Members of the Bundestag 1957–1961
Members of the Bundestag 1953–1957
Members of the Order of Merit of North Rhine-Westphalia
Members of the Steering Committee of the Bilderberg Group
MEPs for Germany 1958–1979
Leaders of political parties in Germany
Luftwaffe personnel of World War II
Free Democratic Party (Germany) MEPs
Vice-Chancellors of Germany
Economic Cooperation ministers of Germany
Grand Crosses Special Class of the Order of Merit of the Federal Republic of Germany
Honorary Knights Grand Cross of the Order of the Bath
Knights Grand Cross of the Order of Merit of the Italian Republic
Grand Collars of the Order of Saint James of the Sword
Nazi Party members
Members of the Bundestag for the Free Democratic Party (Germany)